Yawnghwe, known as Nyaungshwe in Burmese, was a Shan state in what is today Myanmar. It was one of the most important of the Southern Shan States. Yawnghwe state included the Inle Lake. The administrative capital was Taunggyi, located in the northern part of the state. The Agent of the British government, the Superintendent of the Southern Shan States, resided at Taunggyi and the king's palace was at Yawnghwe.

History
According to tradition in very distant antiquity there was a predecessor state in the area named Kambojaraṭṭha (ကမ္ဗောဇရဋ္ဌ).

The city of Yawnghwe, which gave name to the state, was founded in 1359 by two mythical brothers, Nga Taung and Nga Naung, who arrived from Tavoy (Dawei) and were allowed to build a capital by a prince who ruled the region. The brothers brought 36 families from Tavoy and established themselves in the new city.

Yawnghwe included the subsidiary states of Mawnang (Heho), Mawson, Loimaw, Loi-ai and Namhkai. Historically the majority of the population in the state belonged to the Intha, Pa-O, Danu, Shan and Taungyo people groups.

The state of Yawnghwe formally accepted the status of British protectorate in 1887.

Sao Shwe Thaik was the first president of the Union of Burma and the last Saopha of Yawnghwe he married Sao Nang Hearn Kham of the royal family of North Hsenwi. His residence in Yawnghwe town, the Haw, is now the "Buddha museum" and is open to the public.

Rulers
The rulers of Yawnghwe bore the title of Saopha; their ritual style was Kambojaraṭṭha Sīripavara Mahāvaṃsa Sudhammarāja. They were entitled to a 9-gun salute by the British authorities.

Saophas

 1359 - 1384 Nga Taung
 1384 - 1400 Nga Naung
 Nga Sa Mauk
 Mauk Hkam
 Ai Hso Yen
 1497 - 1510 Hkun Ai from Kyaing Taung
 1510 - 1522 Kiao Lan Hom
 1522 - 1532 Hkam Ai Lan
 1532 - 1562 Nga Thein Hpa
 1562 - 1590 Shwe Sayan
 1590 - 1607 Haw Lung Hkam Hlaing Hpa
 1607 - 1615 Sai Mauk Hpa
 1615 - 1634 Kiao Hsan Hpa
 1634 - 1647 Hsa Hung Hpa
 1647 - 1667 Hkun Hpong Hpa
 1667 - 1675 Hso Sieng Hpa
 1675 - 1695 Hkam Hsawng Hpa
 1695 - 1733 Hkam Leng Hpa
 1733 - 1737 Htawk Sha Sa
 1737 - 1746 Hsi Ton Sa
 1746 - 1758 Hke Hsa Wa
 1758 - 1758 Naw Mong I
 1758 - 1761 Yawt Hkam
 1761 - 1762 Hpong Hpa Ka-sa
 1762 - 1815 Sao Yun
 1815 - 1818 Sao Hso U I
 1818 - 1821 Naw Mong II
 1821 - 1852 Sao Hso U II
 1852 - 1858 Sao Hso Hom (d. 1858)
 1858 - 1864 Sao Naw Hpa
23 Oct 1864 - 1885 Sao Maung (1st time) (b. 1848 - d. 1927)
 1886 - 1897 Sao Ohn
 1897 - Dec 1926 Sao Maung (2nd time) (s.a.) (from 19.., Sir Sao Maung)
 Sep 1927 - 1952 Sao Hkam Suek aka  Sao Shwe Thaik (b. 1896 - d. 1962) 33rd Saopha (The First President of Burma)

Traditional royal ceremonies
Formerly the Saopha of Yawnghwe would personally welcome the four Buddha images during the annual festival at Hpaung Daw U Pagoda, an 18-day pagoda festival, during which the Buddha images were placed on a replica of a royal barge designed as a hintha bird and taken in a procession throughout Inle Lake. The elaborately decorated barge was towed by several boats of leg-rowers rowing in unison together with other accompanying boats. The images would be taken from the royal barge and a grand procession would take them to the palace or haw of the Saopha, entering the prayer hall from the eastern entrance, where the images would be kept for a few hours.

Nowadays the festival is still held, but the images bypass the visit to the haw and are taken directly to the temple.

See also
Salute state
Hso Khan Pha

References

External links

"Gazetteer of Upper Burma and the Shan states"
The Imperial Gazetteer of India

 
14th-century establishments in Burma
1359 establishments in Asia
1959 disestablishments in Burma

ca:Yawnghwe